Matthias Doepke is a German economist and currently HSBC Research Professor at Northwestern University. His research focuses on economic growth, development, political economy and monetary economics.

Education 
Doepke received his Vordiplom from the University of Hagen in 1993 and his Diplom at the Humboldt University of Berlin in 1995. He went on to further study at the University of Chicago and graduated with a Ph.D. in economics in 2000.

Career 
The University of California, Los Angeles appointed him as an assistant professor in economics upon graduating from Chicago. He was promoted to associate professor in 2006, but left for an associate professorship at Northwestern University in 2008. He was promoted to full professor in 2012. He also works as a research associate at the National Bureau of Economic Research and as a research fellow at the Center for Economic Policy Research and the IZA Institute of Labor Economics.

Doepke is an editor of the Review of Economic Dynamics and served as its editor-in-chief from 2013 to 2017. He also serves as an associate editor of the American Economic Review, the Journal of Economic Growth and the Journal of Demographic Economics.

The Econometric Society elected him fellow in 2020.

Selected works

References

External links 

 Profile on the website of Northwestern University

Year of birth missing (living people)
University of Hagen alumni
Humboldt University of Berlin alumni
University of Chicago alumni
University of California, Los Angeles faculty
Northwestern University faculty
Fellows of the Econometric Society
Monetary economists
Political economists
German development economists
Growth economists
Living people